The Abel Tasman Inland Track is a 38 km tramping track that runs through the centre of the Abel Tasman National Park and is maintained by the Department of Conservation. It diverts from the main Abel Tasman Coast Track between Tinline Bay and Torrent Bay.  Although the coast track has the reputation of being New Zealand's most popular walking track, the inland track is a much less walked route, with regular back-country huts.

Location

See also
 National parks of New Zealand
 New Zealand tramping tracks

References

External links
Department of Conservation Information on the Abel Tasman Inland Track
Department of Conservation information on Abel Tasman National Park

Hiking and tramping tracks in the Tasman District
Abel Tasman National Park